Bidmead is an English surname. Notable people with this name include:
 Bill Bidmead (1882–1961), English footballer
 Christopher H. Bidmead (born 1941), British writer and journalist
 Stephanie Bidmead (1929–1974), British stage and television actress

English-language surnames